El Moro is an unincorporated community and a census-designated place (CDP) located in and governed by Las Animas County, Colorado, United States. The population of the El Moro CDP was 221 at the United States Census 2010. The Trinidad post office (Zip Code 81082) serves the area.

History

The El Moro post office was established in 1876, and remained in operation until 1933. El Moro is a name derived from Spanish meaning "the Moor". After the company was established in 1892, Colorado Fuel & Iron took over the El Moro operation. During its years of operation, 8,063,076 tons of coal were shipped from El Moro on CF&I's narrow gauge railway, connecting them with the Colorado & Southern line.

Geography
El Moro is in west-central Las Animas County, bordering the northeast side of the city of Trinidad, the county seat. U.S. Route 160 runs along the southeast edge of the CDP, leading southwest  to the center of Trinidad and east  to Springfield. U.S. Route 350 branches off from US 160 at the eastern edge of El Moro and leads northeast  to La Junta. The Purgatoire River runs through the community, flowing northeast toward the Arkansas River.

Demographics

See also

Outline of Colorado
Index of Colorado-related articles
State of Colorado
Colorado cities and towns
Colorado census designated places
Colorado counties
Las Animas County, Colorado

References

External links

Las Animas County website

Census-designated places in Las Animas County, Colorado
Census-designated places in Colorado